Édson Manoel do Nascimento (born 27 July 1967), better known as Edinho Baiano, is a former Brazilian footballer.

Club statistics

References

External links

kyotosangadc

1967 births
Living people
Brazilian footballers
J1 League players
Kyoto Sanga FC players
Esporte Clube Vitória players
Joinville Esporte Clube players
Sociedade Esportiva Palmeiras players
Paraná Clube players
Club Athletico Paranaense players
Londrina Esporte Clube players
Coritiba Foot Ball Club players
Avaí FC players
Brazilian expatriate footballers
Expatriate footballers in Japan
Association football defenders